The 2022 Liga Profesional de Primera División season, also known as the Campeonato Uruguayo de Primera División 2022, was the 119th season of the Uruguayan Primera División, Uruguay's top-flight football league, and the 92nd in which it is professional. The season, which was named "Walter Devoto", began on 5 February and ended on 30 October 2022 due to the 2022 FIFA World Cup to be held in Qatar during November and December 2022.

Nacional were the champions, winning their forty-ninth league title after placing first in the season's aggregate table and defeating Liverpool in the semi-final match. Peñarol were the defending champions.

Teams
16 teams competed in the season: the top thirteen teams in the relegation table of the 2021 season as well as three promoted teams from the Segunda División. The three lowest placed teams in the relegation table of the 2021 season, Progreso, Sud América, and Villa Española, were relegated to the Segunda División for the 2022 season. They were replaced by Albion, Danubio, and Defensor Sporting, who were promoted from the Segunda División.

Danubio and Defensor Sporting returned to the top flight after one season, whilst Albion played in Primera División for the first time in the professional era. On the other hand, both Sud América and Villa Española were relegated after one season, and Progreso returned to the second tier after four years.

Stadiums and locations

Managerial changes

Notes

Torneo Apertura
The Torneo Apertura, named "José "Pino" Marciano", was the first tournament of the 2022 season. It began on 5 February 2022 and ended on 6 June 2022.

Standings

Results

Torneo Intermedio
The Torneo Intermedio was the second tournament of the 2022 season, played between the Apertura and Clausura tournaments, and returned after a one-year hiatus caused by the effects of the COVID-19 pandemic. It consisted of two groups whose composition depended on the final standings of the Torneo Apertura: teams in odd-numbered positions played in Serie A, and teams in even-numbered positions played in Serie B. It began on 10 June and ended on 27 July, and the winners were granted a berth into the 2023 Copa Sudamericana and the 2023 Supercopa Uruguaya.

Serie A

Serie B

Torneo Intermedio Final

Torneo Clausura
The Torneo Clausura, named "Rubén Lorenzo", was the third and last tournament of the 2022 season. It began on 30 July 2022 and ended on 24 October 2022.

Standings

Results

Aggregate table

Championship playoff

Semi-final

Finals
Since Nacional, who had the best record in the aggregate table, won the semi-final, they became champions automatically and the finals were not played. Liverpool became runners-up as the second-placed team in the aggregate table. Both teams qualified for the 2023 Copa Libertadores group stage.

Top scorers
{| class="wikitable" border="1"
|-
! Rank
! Player
! Club
! Goals
|-
| align=center | 1
| Thiago Borbas
|River Plate
| align=center | 18
|-
| align=center | 2
| Thiago Vecino
|Liverpool
| align=center | 15
|-
| align=center | 3
| Agustín Rodríguez
|Boston River
| align=center | 13
|-
| align=center | 4
| Maximiliano Cantera
|Deportivo Maldonado
| align=center | 12
|-
| rowspan=4 align=center | 5
| Emmanuel Gigliotti
|Nacional
| rowspan=4 align=center | 11
|-
| Alan Medina
|Liverpool
|-
| Mauro Méndez
|Montevideo Wanderers
|-
| José Neris
|Albion
|-
| rowspan=2 align=center | 9
| Enzo Borges
|Deportivo Maldonado
| rowspan=2 align=center | 10
|-
| Franco Fagúndez
|Nacional
|}

Source: AUF

Relegation
Relegation was determined at the end of the season by computing an average of the number of points earned per game over the two most recent seasons: 2021 and 2022. The three teams with the lowest average at the end of the season were relegated to the Segunda División for the following season.

Season awards
On 14 and 16 December 2022 the AUF announced the winners of the season awards, who were chosen by its Technical Staff based on voting by managers and captains of the 16 Primera División teams as well as a group of local sports journalists. 36 players were nominated for Best Player and the Team of the Season according to their ratings and evaluations by the Technical Staff throughout the season.

See also
 2022 Copa Uruguay
 2022 Uruguayan Segunda División season

References

External links
Asociación Uruguaya de Fútbol - Campeonato Uruguayo 

2022
2022 in Uruguayan football
Uruguay